The Paris-Galt Moraine are a pair of glacial moraines left behind by the Laurentian glaciation, in southern Ontario.  The moraines run parallel, and sometime merge.

In 2007, Guelph city council requested the Province to assist in adding undeveloped portions of the moraines, within city limits, to the Province's greenbelt plan.  But, by 2009, the city reversed its position, and develop its moraine lands, after all.

References

Moraines of Ontario